Liebenau is a municipality in the district of Nienburg, in Lower Saxony, Germany. It is situated on the left bank of the Weser, approx. 10 km southwest of Nienburg, and 40 km northeast of Minden.

Liebenau was the seat of the former Samtgemeinde ("collective municipality") Liebenau.

Villages and hamlets
The hamlet (Bauernschaft) of Reese is in Liebenau municipality.

References

Nienburg (district)